The 1998–99 FIS Ski Jumping World Cup was the 20th World Cup season in ski jumping and the 9th official World Cup season in ski flying. It began in Lillehammer, Norway on 28 November 1998 and finished in Planica, Slovenia on 21 March 1999 The individual World Cup was won by Martin Schmitt and Nations Cup by Japan.

Lower competitive circuits this season included the Grand Prix and Continental Cup.

Map of world cup hosts 
All 19 locations which have been hosting world cup events for men this season. Oberstdorf hosted world cup events on large hill for two different times.

 Four Hills Tournament
 Nordic Tournament

Calendar

Men

Men's team

Standings

Overall

Ski Jumping (JP) Cup

Ski Flying

Nations Cup

Four Hills Tournament

Nordic Tournament

References 

World cup
World cup
FIS Ski Jumping World Cup